Trochia cingulata, common name : the girdled dogwhelk, is a species of sea snail, a marine gastropod mollusk in the family Muricidae, the murex snails or rock snails.

Description
The shell size varies between 20 mm and 45 mm

Distribution
This species occurs in the Atlantic Ocean off Namibia and the West Coast of South Africa.

References

 Branch, G.M. et al. (2002). Two Oceans. 5th impression. David Philip, Cate Town & Johannesburg
 Houart R., Kilburn R.N. & Marais A.P. (2010) Muricidae. pp. 176–270, in: Marais A.P. & Seccombe A.D. (eds), Identification guide to the seashells of South Africa. Volume 1. Groenkloof: Centre for Molluscan Studies. 376 pp

External links
 

Ocenebrinae
Molluscs described in 1771
Taxa named by Carl Linnaeus